Sharon Douglas (born 9 February 1960 in Brandon, Manitoba) is a Canadian basketball player.

She competed at the 1979 FIBA World Championship for Women winning a bronze medal, the 1979 Pan-American Games winning a bronze medal, and 1979 Summer Universiade, winning a bronze medal.

From 1977 to 1981, she played for Regina Cougars.

References 

Canadian basketball players
1960 births
Living people
Basketball people from Manitoba